The 1966 Senior League World Series took place from August 18–20 in Des Moines, Iowa, United States. East Rochester, New York defeated La Habra, California in the championship game.

Teams

Results

References

Senior League World Series
Senior League World Series
Baseball in Iowa